William A. Halter Jr (born November 30, 1960) is an American politician who served as the 18th lieutenant governor of Arkansas from 2007 to 2011. A member of the Democratic Party, he was elected to succeed the late Republican Winthrop Paul Rockefeller in 2006, defeating Republican challenger Jim Holt.

Before his election as lieutenant governor, Halter served as the Deputy Commissioner (1999–2001) and Acting Commissioner (2001) of the Social Security Administration. He previously worked as a senior adviser in the Office of Management and Budget from 1993 to 1999. A native of North Little Rock, he is a graduate of Stanford University and Oxford University.

He unsuccessfully challenged two-term incumbent Blanche Lincoln for the Democratic nomination for the U.S. Senate, losing in the June 8, 2010, runoff after neither won a majority in the May primary. After the bruising primary, Lincoln lost to her Republican opponent John Boozman in the general election. Halter ran for the Democratic nomination for Governor of Arkansas in 2014 but dropped out, citing concerns over a divisive primary hurting Democratic chances for the seat.

Early life and career
A fourth-generation Arkansan, Halter was born and raised in North Little Rock. He graduated from Little Rock Catholic High School as valedictorian of his class in 1979.

A National Merit Scholar and a 1981 Harry S. Truman Scholar, he studied economics and political science at Stanford University in Palo Alto, California, where in 1983 he earned a Bachelor of Arts with honors and distinction in 1983. He was a member of Phi Beta Kappa. Upon graduation from Stanford, he won a Rhodes Scholarship to Oxford University in England, where he received a Master of Philosophy degree in economics in 1986. Following his return to the United States, he became a management consultant with McKinsey & Company.

Public service
Halter entered the public sector, serving as an economist to the U.S. Congress Joint Economic Committee and as chief economist for the U.S. Senate Committee on Finance. Following the election of fellow Arkansan Bill Clinton as President of the United States, Halter joined the new administration as a senior adviser in the Office of Management and Budget (OMB) in 1993. He advised on a range of policy issues, reviewed and evaluated budgets and management practices of Federal cabinet departments, presented budget options to the President, and formulated Administration positions on domestic and international policy issues. He also coordinated the work of the President's Management Council, a group consisting of the Chief Operating Officers of the Federal Cabinet departments.

On October 1, 1999, Halter was nominated by President Clinton to serve as Deputy Commissioner of the Social Security Administration. He was unanimously confirmed by the United States Senate on November 10, 1999, becoming the first confirmed Deputy Commissioner of the SSA as an independent agency. As the agency's Chief Operating Officer, he was responsible for the delivery of more than $500 billion in benefits to over 48 million Americans and managed 65,000 employees in 1,500 offices. 

During his tenure, he encouraged the use of computer technology in all aspects of SSA's operations. Of particular interest to Halter was the use of the Internet, both as an informational service and a service-delivery method. He pushed the Agency to accelerate its adoption of Internet service delivery and maintained constant pressure on the organization to find new and innovative ways to use the Internet in its business operations. From January 21 to March 28, 2001, Halter served as Acting Commissioner of the SSA during the first months of the administration of George W. Bush. Halter re-entered the private sector by joining the board of directors of several companies in biotechnology and information technology, including Akamai Technologies, webMethods, InterMune, Threshold Pharmaceuticals and Xenogen.

Political career

In the run-up to the 2006 Arkansas elections, Halter initially ran for Governor of Arkansas, but dropped out in March 2006 and instead ran successfully for lieutenant governor. He won a Democratic primary election run-off against Tim Wooldridge and then defeated Jim L. Holt of Springdale, a conservative former Republican state legislator and Southern Baptist minister, in the general election.

In 2007, there was speculation that Halter would run for the United States Senate against incumbent Mark Pryor in 2008, but this did not occur. He chaired the Democratic Lieutenant Governors Association and of the Southern Region of the National Lieutenant Governors Association.

On March 1, 2010, Halter announced his candidacy in the 2010 U.S. Senate election, challenging two-term incumbent Blanche Lincoln in the Democratic primary. After one month of fund-raising, the Halter campaign announced that it had raised more than $2 million, mostly from out-of-state and from national labor unions. On May 18, 2010, Halter and a minor third candidate prevented Lincoln from polling over 50% of the vote, thus triggering a runoff on June 8 between Lincoln and Halter, which Lincoln narrowly won. Lincoln ultimately lost the general election to her Republican opponent, U.S. Representative John Boozman.

Halter has been described as an outspoken supporter of gay rights and a "classic populist, progressive Democrat".

Political positions

The economy
Halter supports investment in clean energy, making broadband accessible to all Arkansans and raising the minimum wage. He opposes trade deals that "send Arkansas jobs abroad and undermine American businesses by undercutting American workers by not requiring the same working conditions as American businesses have to meet."

Education
A supporter of the scholarship lottery, which has helped 28,000 families afford higher education without raising taxes, Halter supports making loans and grants more affordable. He criticised then-U.S. Senator Blanche Lincoln's support for the big banks that profit from student loans. He supports the Student Aid and Fiscal Responsibility Act which would expand federal Pell Grants and end federally-subsidized private loans, using all federal student loan funding for direct loans and cutting the deficit by $87 billion over 10 years. Halter criticised Lincoln for opposing the act.

Health care
Halter backs then President Obama's efforts to reform health care, saying that although the Patient Protection and Affordable Care Act could have been better, he supports it because it provides 450,000 uninsured Arkansans with health care. He criticized Blanche Lincoln for watering down the act, claiming she "sided with the insurance companies and HMOs who gave her campaign more than $800,000."

Farming and rural communities
Halter has made agriculture one of his "top priorities", pledging to support farmers, not corporate agribusiness. He believes that too much money is given in subsidies to those who don't need it, whilst failing to provide support for family farmers.

Consumer protection and financial reform
Halter has repeatedly criticised Congress' close relationship with special interests and lobby groups. He has said that banks that take taxpayers' money should be held to account. He supports reforms that get banks lending money to Main Street and small businesses whilst preventing a repeat of the financial crisis. Halter supports the creation of an independent watchdog agency, an end to sky-high corporate compensation, and better checks and balances on financial industry practices.

Family
Halter and his wife Shanti have two daughters. They are members of Immaculate Conception Catholic Church in North Little Rock.

Electoral history

References

External links
 
Campaign contributions OpenSecrets.org (U.S. Senate race)

|-

1960 births
21st-century American politicians
Alumni of St John's College, Oxford
American Rhodes Scholars
Arkansas Democrats
Candidates in the 2010 United States elections
Clinton administration personnel
Lieutenant Governors of Arkansas
Living people
Politicians from North Little Rock, Arkansas
Stanford University alumni
Catholics from Arkansas
George W. Bush administration personnel
Commissioners of the Social Security Administration